Fitzgerald House may refer to:
Fitzgerald Station and Farmstead, Springdale, Arkansas, listed on the National Register of Historic Places (NRHP)
Fitzgerald House (Minden, Louisiana), listed on the NRHP in Webster Parish, Louisiana
F. Scott Fitzgerald House, St. Paul, Minnesota, NRHP-listed
Paul Fitzgerald House, Louisville, Nebraska, listed on the NRHP in Cass County, Nebraska
Perry and Agnes Wadsworth Fitzgerald House, Draper, Utah, NRHP-listed
Thomas Fitzgerald House, Port Townsend, Washington, listed on the NRHP in Jefferson County, Washington
Rural Home, the plantation of Philip Fitzgerald (great-grandfather of Margaret Mitchell) in Clayton County, Georgia.